Balchik Airfield , is a general aviation airfield and reduced former military airbase in the town of Balchik, northeast Bulgaria, on the Black Sea coast. In August 2011 the Bulgarian government transformed Balchik airbase from a military to a civilian airport and it became part of the assets of the state-owned company Sofia Airport EAD.

Due to its strategic location, the former military airfield has been home to different military aviation formations and performed different types of tasks related to the country's defence. Despite major structural changes in the Bulgarian Air Force, the disbandment and closure of military airbases, Balchik airbase continues to perform reduced defence-related tasks.

The intention to organize civil flights at Balchik airfield and its use as both a military airbase and a civilian airport established Balchik as a non-commercial regional transport hub, providing jobs and better use of the resources in this region. On 3 May 2012 at 19:06 the first private civil flight "Prague-Varna-Balchik" landed, via neighbouring Varna Airport due to the lack of passport border control at Balchik airport. The airport's general aviation civil aviation license at this stage is for non-commercial flights with a maximum takeoff weight up to 5.7 tonnes and for flights within the European Union 48 hours prior notice is required for the airport to provide a border police control presence; this is due to Bulgaria currently not being a member of the EU Schengen Area.

Description
Balchik airfield is located 2 kilometres northwest of the centre of Balchik on an area of 3700 decares of flat terrain, at an altitude of 188 metres and the runway is about one kilometre from the coastline. Due to this, its strategic location is called "the unsinkable aircraft carrier of Bulgaria". Its location allows when taking off in the direction of the Black Sea to immediately begin the descent to 150–180 metres, which makes it unique in Bulgaria. The runway has a length of 2498 x 60 metres.

The military airbase operated until 1998 as the 6th Fighter Air Base of the Bulgarian Air Force, when the last MiG-21bis and Aero L-29 Delfíns were transferred to the 26th Reconnaissance Air Base, ending the base's period as a front-line military airbase. Since 1998, the airbase has been active as the 6th Aviation Material Preservation Base for tasks related to other operating military airbases with fighter jets such as the MiG-29, Su-25 and Albatros L-39ZA trainer, transport/utility aircraft such as the Alenia C-27J Spartan or helicopters such as the Mil Mi-24V Hind E, Mil Mi-17 and Eurocopter AS532 Cougar. The reduced staff keep the airfield infrastructure ready to accept military aircraft participating in tactical training flights in naval exercises, parachuting, airlifts, air-sea rescue and training at the Shabla air force air gunnery firing range.

History
The first information about the establishment of an airfield in the region is from 1 July 1935. The town of Balchik was at that time within the Kingdom of Romania. The established civil airfield served the Balchik-Constanţa-Bucharest air route and was probably established by the will of the Romanian royal dynasty; to use the resort facilities of the region and the summer palace residence of Queen Marie of Romania, Balchik Palace is located 2 kilometres south-west of Balchik. The air traffic was carried out by several 6-seater Junkers (Junkers F 13) aircraft.

By virtue of the Treaty of Craiova in 1940, Southern Dobruja was returned to Bulgaria. The departing Romanian authorities had practically destroyed everything related to the airfield - the equipment had been removed, the windows were broken or the buildings half-destroyed, the water wells blocked. Even the runway was ploughed across. The following year, the Bulgarian government approved plans by the defence ministry to use the airfield for military purposes.

Military air base
The first military aircraft based on Balchik airfield were in fact several aircraft of types Heinkel 111 and Junkers 88 of the German Luftwaffe, mainly for reconnaissance flights during World War Two. The Luftwaffe also rebuilt the airfield. With the German invasion of the Soviet Union in Operation Barbarossa on 22 June 1941, this small German military unit left the borders of Bulgaria.

 The first Bulgarian aviation formation was the Air Gunnery School, stationed on 24 May 1941 and operating until 9 September 1944.
 On 4 August 1941 Balchik airfield was home to 5 Czechoslovak-built Letov-Šmolik Š-328 aircraft, sold to Bulgaria by Germany after its annexation of Czechoslovakia and its industry. The aircraft, assigned to the Bulgarian 2nd Air Regiment, provided anti-submarine defence for German ship transports travelling in the Black Sea from Constanţa to the Bosphorus.
 On 1 October 1941, the Galata Fighter Wing was formed on the basis of and in pursuance of a confidential decree No. I-2733 of the Bulgarian Air Force Headquarters. The Bulgarian 682nd Fighter Squadron of the 6th Fighter Regiment was based at Balchik airfield with a complement of German Messerschmitt Bf 109E aircraft and is considered the birth date of Balchik military airbase.
 From May 1945 to September 1946, in connection with a re-armament, almost all Bulgarian fighter pilots underwent training on the Soviet Yakovlev Yak-9 fighter plane, using the base at Balchik airfield.
 In September 1947 the formation of a Mine-Torpedo Aviation Regiment began, and in 1951 the regiment grew into the 3rd Bomber Air Division. On 13 April 1955, the division was disbanded.
 On 18 October 1955, the 27th Fighter Regiment transferred from Bezmer Air Base to Balchik air base, marking the beginning of the fighter regiment's home base. The 27th Fighter Regiment disbanded and ceased to exist in the air force on 1 May 1963.
 After a reorganization, the 3rd Fighter Squadron was stationed at Balchik airbase armed with the MiG-17F aircraft, as part of the 15th Fighter Regiment located at Ravnets Air Base. In 1970 the Balchik squadron changed its numbering and became the 2nd Fighter Squadron.

See also
List of Bulgarian Air Force bases
List of Bulgarian military bases
Graf Ignatievo Air Base
Ravnets Air Base
Bezmer Air Base
Cheshnegirovo Air Base
Dobroslavtsi Air Base
Dobrich Air Base
Gabrovnitsa Air Base
Uzundzhovo Air Base
Bulgarian VIP State Aviation Operator (formerly Aviation Detachment 28)
Military of Bulgaria
List of joint US-Bulgarian military bases

References

External links
 Photo of Bulgaria Air Force helicopters (Mil Mi-24V Hind E) at Balchik Airbase

Airports in Bulgaria